Bad Men of Tombstone is a 1949 American Western film from King Brothers Productions. It was co-written by Philip Yordan and stars Barry Sullivan and Broderick Crawford. King Brothers announced plans for a sequel, The Marshall of Tombstone but it was never made.

Plot
Tom Horn tries to steal back $200 he lost in a poker game. He is thrown into a jail cell with outlaw William Morgan, whose gang members Red, Curly and Mingo break them out. Tom wins their trust by robbing a Colorado mining company. He is recognized by Julie, the company's bookkeeper, but she is attracted to him. The gang rides to Tombstone, Arizona, unhappy that Tom has married Julie and brought her along. A posse shoots Curly, who informs on the whereabouts of the rest. Red is murdered by Mingo, not wanting to split the loot. Tom is able to kill both Mingo and Morgan, but can't outdraw the law.

Cast
 Barry Sullivan as Tom
 Broderick Crawford as Morgan
 Marjorie Reynolds as Julie
 Guinn Williams as Red
 John Kellogg as Curly
 Virginia Carroll as Matilda
 Fortunio Bonanova as Mingo

References

External links
 
 

1949 films
1949 Western (genre) films
American Western (genre) films
American black-and-white films
Films directed by Kurt Neumann
Films scored by Roy Webb
Monogram Pictures films
Revisionist Western (genre) films
1940s American films
1940s English-language films